Quebrada del Nuevo Reino (Spanish for brook of the new kingdom) is a Chilean village located in Pichilemu, Cardenal Caro Province.

Populated places in Pichilemu